The prehensile-tailed hutia (Mysateles prehensilis) is a small, furry, rat-like mammal found only in forests on Cuba. It is the only member of the genus Mysateles. It climbs and lives in trees where it eats only leaves, and it is threatened by habitat loss. The prehensile-tailed hutia is a member of the hutia subfamily (Capromyinae), a group of rodents native to the Caribbean that are mostly endangered or extinct. There is one subspecies, M. prehensilis gundlachi (also known as Chapman's prehensile-tailed hutia or Gundlach's hutia).

Taxonomy

Within Capromyidae, the closest relative of Mysateles is the genus Mesocapromys. Both genera are the sister group to Capromys, and then Geocapromys is a more distant genus. In turn, these four genera belong to the tribe Capromyini, and are the sister group to Plagiodontia.

Several other hutia species such as Garrido's hutia (Capromys garridoi) and the black-tailed hutia (Mesocapromys melanurus) were formerly classified in Mysateles, but phylogenetic evidence found them to belong in different genera, leaving only M. prehensilis in Mysateles.

A subspecies, Mysateles prehensilis gundlachi (also known as Chapman's prehensile-tailed hutia or Gundlach's hutia) was previously considered a separate species (Mysateles gundlachi). The Isla De La Juventud tree hutia (M. p. meridionalis) was also previously considered a separate species, but was found to be a subspecies by phylogenetic studies.

Genetics
Its karyotype has 2n = 34 and FN = 54–56.

Habitat and conservation
The species is found in both primary and secondary forest. It is listed as near threatened on the IUCN Red List. Although locally common in some areas, it is in decline and is threatened by deforestation and habitat fragmentation.

References

Mysateles
Endemic fauna of Cuba
Mammals of Cuba
Mammals of the Caribbean
Near threatened animals
Mammals described in 1824
Taxonomy articles created by Polbot
Taxa named by Eduard Friedrich Poeppig